MS Crown Iris is a cruise ship owned by Mano Maritime. She was originally ordered by Birka Line as MS Birka Queen from the Wärtsilä Marine Turku Shipyard in Finland, but completed by Kvaerner Masa-Yards as MS Royal Majesty for Majesty Cruise Line. She was sold to Louis Cruises as the MS Louis Majesty from 2008 to 2012 when she was chartered to Thomson Cruises as the MS Thomson Majesty before being returned to Louis Cruises/Celestyal Cruises, as the Majesty. In 2018 the ship sold to Mano Maritime.

Concept and construction
The ship was ordered from Wärtsilä Marine, but the shipyard went bankrupt in 1989. Operations were soon reorganized under the name of Masa-Yards, but the price of the ship was increased in the process, and Birka therefore refused to take delivery. Instead, the build contact was sold to Majesty Cruise Line, who took delivery of the ship on 2 July 1992, renaming her Royal Majesty. Due to her past, the ship has some features uncommon for cruise ships, such as the highest Finnish-Swedish ice class.

Service history

Following delivery, Royal Majesty set on her maiden voyage, a transatlantic crossing from Southampton to New York City, on 7 July 1992. She was officially christened in New York City on 21 July 1992. She was christened by Liza Minnelli. Following this, she was used on three- and four-night cruises out of Florida. In 1994 she initiated a new northern hemisphere summer season itinerary with cruises from Boston to St. George's, Bermuda, returning to Florida for the winter season.

Investigators found that the officers failed to act on visual cues about the vessel's location, over-relying on the automated bridge system. The vessel, with 1,509 persons on board, was en route from St. George's, Bermuda, to Boston, Massachusetts. There were no deaths or injuries as a result of this accident. Damage to the vessel and lost revenue, however, were estimated at about $7 million.

Majesty Cruise Line ceased operations at the end of the 1997 summer season, and Royal Majesty was sold to Norwegian Cruise Line. She was renamed Norwegian Majesty, and in 1999 she received a  lengthening at the Lloyd Werft shipyard in Bremerhaven, Germany. Similar lengthenings had been carried out on NCL's  and  the previous year. The lengthening of the Norwegian Majesty however was more technically complicated than those of the other ships, as she had not been designed for such an operation.

In 2004 the ownership of Norwegian Majesty was transferred to NCL's parent company Star Cruises in preparation for potential transfer to the Star Cruises fleet or sale at a later date. She remained in NCL service without other changes. On 23 April 2008 Norwegian Majesty, was sold to the Cyprus-based Louis Cruise Lines. Louis Cruise Lines had reportedly outbid International Shipping Partners with their offer of $162 million. The deal was completed on 29 July 2008, but Norwegian Majesty was chartered back to Norwegian Cruise Line until October 2009.

On 24 June 2009, Louis revealed that Norwegian Majesty would be renamed Louis Majesty. On 3 March 2010, three rogue waves hit Louis Majesty, killing two passengers, and injuring a number of others, while on a 12-day cruise around the Mediterranean. Water was taken on in the saloon area, which then drained down the decks below. The ship returned to port at Barcelona to receive repairs.

Louis Majesty was chartered to Thomson Cruises from May 2012 and renamed Thomson Majesty. It sailed from Corfu in the summer and the Canary Islands in the winter.

On 10 February 2013, while the ship was docked in Santa Cruz de la Palma in the Canary Islands, five crew members were killed and three others injured during a safety drill when the lifeboat they were in fell into the sea, trapping the occupants. Julian Bray, Marine Analyst in the UK,  writing in the Cduck media news blog, confirms that crew were taking part in a training exercise to load, launch, and recover lifeboats, complete a regular risk/ safety programme and to ensure crew members have had recent practical training. Malta's Maritime Safety Investigation Unit subsequently issued a safety alert following the discovery of significant corrosion on the inner strands of the fall wire involved. The wire rope had parted approximately where it rested over the topmost sheave, when the davit was in its stowed position. The fore and aft davit's fall wires had been replaced on 22 August 2010 and the next scheduled replacement was due in August 2014. In Her Later Career With Thomson Cruises, She Was Given A Refit Adding Several Balcony Cabins To The Ship.

In November 2017 she joined "Celestyal Cruises" and renamed simply as "Majesty".

Service as Crown Iris 
In late 2018, Majesty was sold to the Israeli cruise line Mano Maritime and renamed Crown Iris. In early 2019, the ship was refurbished and lengthened in a stretch and total rebuild operation, extending her length to 216 meters. On 7 May 2019, the ship docked for the first time in Haifa port, Israel, and On 11 April the Crown Iris launching ceremony was held.

Areas of operation

As Norwegian Majesty she was based in various US ports and cruised to the Caribbean.

As Louis Majesty she was based in Piraeus, Greece and undertook cruises around the Greek Isles.

As Thomson Majesty she was based in Corfu, Greece and sailed in the Mediterranean from June–October, and during the winter sailed to the Canary Islands & Morocco.

As Crown Iris she is based in Haifa, Israel and cruise along the coasts of the Mediterranean, the Black Sea and to various destinations in Europe.

Gallery

References

Passenger ships of Norway
Ships of Norwegian Cruise Line
Ships of Celestyal Cruises
Ships built in Turku
1991 ships
Rogue wave incidents
Maritime incidents in 2010
Maritime incidents in 2013